The Pembina County Courthouse in Cavalier, North Dakota was built in 1912.  It was designed by architects Buechner & Orth in Beaux Arts style.  It was listed on the National Register of Historic Places (NRHP) in 1980.

The courthouse is the only Buechner & Orth-designed courthouse in North Dakota to not have a central dome. The listing includes a second contributing building, a sheriff's residence and jail.

References

Courthouses on the National Register of Historic Places in North Dakota
County courthouses in North Dakota
Beaux-Arts architecture in North Dakota
Government buildings completed in 1912
1912 establishments in North Dakota
National Register of Historic Places in Pembina County, North Dakota